Spider-Man is a 2002 action-adventure game based on the 2002 film of the same name. It was released for the PlayStation 2, Xbox, GameCube, Microsoft Windows, and Game Boy Advance on April 16, 2002, in North America (two weeks before the film's release), and June 7 in Europe. The Game Boy Advance version was later re-released and bundled on Twin Pack cartridge with Spider-Man 2 in 2005. Published by Activision, the console versions were developed by Activision's then recently acquired subsidiary Treyarch, who had previously ported Neversoft's 2000's Spider-Man to Microsoft Windows and Dreamcast. LTI Gray Matter developed the Microsoft Windows version and Digital Eclipse developed the Game Boy Advance version.

While the game directly adapts the plot of the film it is based on, it also builds upon it by including scenes from the film and villains don't appear in the movie. Tobey Maguire and Willem Dafoe reprise their roles from the film, as Spider-Man and the Green Goblin, respectively, while Bruce Campbell, who played a wrestling ring announcer in the movie, narrates the game's tutorial and bonus levels.

Upon release, it received generally positive reviews and quickly became a best-seller, although some criticized its length, voice acting, and camera control. After the game's success, Treyarch became the lead developer of all major Spider-Man titles published under Activision until 2008, including the sequels Spider-Man 2, the video game based on the 2004 film of the same name, and Spider-Man 3, the video game based on the 2007 film of the same name.

Gameplay
Like the 2000 Spider-Man game and its 2001 sequel, Spider-Man 2: Enter Electro, Spider-Man is a level-based beat 'em up video game, where the player takes on the role of the superhero Spider-Man. While most levels are indoors, there are several levels set outside, among the sky-scrapers of New York, which require the player to web-sling from building to building, as falling below a certain height will result in an instant Game Over. Levels use a scoring system that covers more aspects, such as  "Time" (clear level in a set time), "Perfect" (not take damage/not be detected) and "Style" (use as many combos as possible). Some levels have other specific aspects, such as "Secrets" (uncover a secret area), "Combat" (defeat all enemies), and "stealth" (remain undetected by enemies). Players can gain, depending on difficulty, points on completing these tasks. On easy mode, each bonus is 500 points, normal is 700, and hero is 1000 each.

The basic abilities are swinging, zipping, punching and kicking, dodging, web, camera lock, and the Web Mode in Enhanced Mode. Depending on how the player combines different buttons, it will have different results. Wall-crawling is automatic, and players are also able to lift up heavy and light objects such as cars and chairs. There are 21 different combos, which are unlocked by collecting Gold Spiders, with 4 web controls, each having a type of "upgrade" to each. The game also features stealth segments, where Spider-Man can hide in the shadows and remain undetected from the enemy. While the game is primarily in third-person, a cheat code allows players to switch to first-person view.

Completing the story mode on each difficulty unlocks different bonuses, namely alternate skins for Spider-Man: completing it on at least easy unlocks Peter Parker in his civilian outfit and Spider-Man's wrestler costume; on at least normal, Alex Ross' prototype design for the movie Spider-Man costume (which will also cause the Green Goblin to have Ross' early design during battles); and on at least hard, the Green Goblin. Unlike the others, the Goblin plays entirely different from Spider-Man, replacing his web-based abilities with gadgets, such as his signature glider, pumpkin bombs, and razor bats. If playing as the Goblin in story mode, while the levels remain unchanged, the narrative is different, and follows Harry Osborn as he becomes the Goblin after his father's death and investigates a secret plot involving Oscorp, while facing off against another Goblin, who claims to have been hired by Norman Osborn.

More playable characters can be unlocked through cheat codes, such as the Shocker and Captain George Stacy, though they serve only as alternate skins for Spider-Man and do not provide any new gameplay mechanics. Mary Jane Watson was initially unlockable through a code as well, but was dropped in re-releases due to the perceived lesbianism implications of scenes featuring the player (playing as Mary Jane) kissing with the in-game Mary Jane.

Plot
Outcast teen genius Peter Parker develops spider-like superhuman abilities after being bitten by a genetically altered spider created by Oscorp. He learns how to use his newfound powers in the form of an optional tutorial, narrated by Bruce Campbell. Peter then decides to use his powers for personal gain and enters a wrestling competition; however, he is cheated out of his prize money by the fight promoter. The promoter is then robbed by a robber, whom Peter lets go out of spite. Shortly afterward, Peter is devastated when his Uncle Ben is killed by a robber, whom the police identify as the leader of the Skulls gang. Peter tracks down and defeats the murderer at a warehouse where he is hiding from the police, only to discover that he is the same robber he let go earlier, who then dies after accidentally slipping out of a window. Remembering Ben's words that "with great power comes great responsibility," Peter vows to use his powers to fight evil and becomes the masked superhero Spider-Man. He also gets a job at the Daily Bugle as a photographer after selling photos of himself as Spider-Man.

Meanwhile, Oscorp CEO Norman Osborn and his scientists are investigating the appearance of this new hero. Anxious to develop his Human Performance Enhancer "Super Soldier" serum, the main goals of which are already exhibited by Spider-Man, Osborn sends robots to capture him, but Spider-Man destroys them. Later, Spider-Man witnesses the Shocker and the Vulture robbing a jewelry store and escaping separately. Going after Shocker first, Spider-Man pursues him through the sewers and into a subway station, where he defeats him. Not wanting to let the Vulture get away with his share of the loot, Shocker tells Spider-Man that he is hiding in an old clock tower. Spider-Man climbs the tower, but the Vulture attempts to escape. After a chase through the city, Spider-Man finally defeats Vulture on top of the Chrysler Building and leaves him, along with the stolen loot, for the police to find.

Later, Oscorp creates several spider-shaped robots to capture Spider-Man. Still, they end up pursuing Scorpion instead, whom they had mistaken for Spider-Man due to him also having arachnid DNA. After returning to the subway station to take photos of his battle site with Shocker, Spider-Man runs into Scorpion and helps him fight off the spider bots. However, an increasingly paranoid Scorpion then attacks Spider-Man, believing he is trying to take him back to the scientists who experimented on him. Scorpion is defeated but manages to escape.

Meanwhile, Osborn is fired from Oscorp due to failing to complete the super-soldier serum in time. He decides to test it on himself, leading to the creation of a psychopathic alternate personality: the Green Goblin. Sporting experimental armor, a glider, and an arsenal of advanced weapons, he attacks the yearly Oscorp Unity Day Festival to exact revenge on those who fired him. Peter's friend and crush, Mary Jane Watson, is caught in the chaos, but Peter intervenes as Spider-Man and rescues her. Grateful, she kisses him, just as a spider bot photographs them from afar. Spider-Man then fights the Goblin, stopping him from harming more bystanders. Impressed, the Goblin offers Spider-Man a chance to join him, but the latter refuses. The Goblin then reveals he has planted bombs filled with deadly gas all over the city and escapes while Spider-Man finds and disarms the bombs.

In the Xbox version only, Osborn later hires Kraven the Hunter to capture Spider-Man. Luring him to a zoo, Kraven poisons him and forces him to complete an obstacle course filled with deadly traps while hunting him. In the end, Spider-Man defeats Kraven and leaves him for the police, obtaining an antidote for the poison in the process.

After another battle with the Goblin, Spider-Man studies a piece of the villain's gear that he recovered and learns that Oscorp manufactured it. Infiltrating the Oscorp building to investigate further, he avoids detection by the security as he makes his way to the secret labs, where he discovers chemical weapons being made and a giant robot, and neutralizes both. Spider-Man then arrives in Osborn's office and learns that the Goblin knows about Mary Jane after seeing the photograph of her kissing him. Deducing that the Goblin kidnapped Mary Jane to lure him out, Spider-Man escapes from Oscorp and chases the Goblin to the Queensboro Bridge, where he rescues Mary Jane and defeats the villain. The Goblin unmasks himself as Osborn and, in a final attempt to kill Spider-Man, accidentally gets impaled by his glider. Before he dies, Osborn asks Spider-Man not to reveal his identity as the Goblin to his son Harry. Spider-Man attempts to reveal his identity to Mary Jane but stops when she kisses him. Spider-Man then ends the game with a fourth wall break, telling the player to "go outside and play."

Development 
Activision said that Spider-Man was one of its top five best selling franchises in North America in 2002. The PlayStation 2 version of the game was ranked at number seven in sales among video game titles released in 2002 in the United States, which was mostly dominated by Grand Theft Auto titles. The game made both PlayStation's Greatest Hits and Xbox's Platinum Hits collections.

Spider-Man was developed in 18 months, compared to 2 years in development for its sequel, Spider-Man 2. The game was designed to be linear or mission-based. And the web-swinging mechanics were basic compared to its sequel, with strands shooting into the sky without attaching to anything.

The game was inspired by the 2002 film Spider-Man when it came to web-swinging. They developed the game at the same time as the movie was made which meant that the game designers would not have been able to watch the entire film until it was finished.

Reception

The critical reviews for the game were positive. GameRankings gave it a score of 78% for the Game Boy Advance version, 76% for the GameCube version, 75% for the PC version, 76% for the PlayStation 2 version, 78% for the Xbox version; and likewise, Metacritic gave it a score of 77 out of 100 for the GameCube version, 75 out of 100 for the PC version, 76 out of 100 for the PlayStation 2 version, and 79 out of 100 for the Xbox version.

Many critics at the time considered it the best Spider-Man game. However, criticism fell on the indoor levels, Tobey Maguire's voice acting and bad camera, as well as the fact that it was too short and could easily be completed in 3 hours. The Cincinnati Enquirer gave the game four stars out of five and stated that it was "worth climbing the walls for".

By July 2006, the PlayStation 2 version of Spider-Man had sold 2.1 million copies and earned $74 million in the United States. Next Generation ranked it as the 15th highest-selling game launched for the PlayStation 2, Xbox or GameCube between January 2000 and July 2006 in that country. Combined sales of Spider-Man console games released in the 2000s reached 6 million units in the United States by July 2006. The PlayStation 2 version also received a "Platinum" sales award from the Entertainment and Leisure Software Publishers Association (ELSPA), indicating sales of at least 300,000 copies in the United Kingdom. Its GameCube and Xbox versions sold over 400,000 copies each. These high sales allowed the game to enter the "Best-Sellers" of each console (PlayStation 2's Greatest Hits, GameCube's Player's Choice and Xbox's Platinum Hits). It was recently promoted to "Best of Platinum Hits" on the Xbox. In the United States, its Game Boy Advance version sold 740,000 copies and earned $23 million by August 2006. During the period between January 2000 and August 2006, it was the 30th highest-selling game launched for the Game Boy Advance, Nintendo DS or PlayStation Portable in that country.

Notes

References

External links

2002 video games
Activision beat 'em ups
Action-adventure games
Game Boy Advance games
GameCube games
PlayStation 2 games
Single-player video games
Sony Pictures video games
Spider-Man (2002 film series)
Superhero video games
Treyarch games
Video games based on Spider-Man
Video games based on Spider-Man films
Video games based on adaptations
Video games based on films
Video games based on Marvel Comics films
Video games set in New York City
Video games with alternative versions
Windows games
Xbox games
Digital Eclipse games
Video games developed in the United States